Michael Patrick Jann (born May 15, 1970, Albany, New York) is an American actor, writer, and director best known as a cast member on MTV's The State.

Career
Jann attended New York University, where, as a freshman, he joined the then-new comedy troupe The New Group, which was eventually renamed to The State. The troupe continued performing after college, and in 1993 they gained their own series on MTV, the sketch comedy show The State, which ran until 1995. Jann and David Wain directed a majority of the sketches on the series.

In 1999, Jann directed the film Drop Dead Gorgeous, which is his feature film directorial debut. Jann produced, and directed many episodes of the 2003-2009 Comedy Central series Reno 911!, which was created by several members of The State. He co-wrote the 2006 film Let's Go to Prison, along with The State members (and Reno 911! cast members) Thomas Lennon and Ben Garant. He directed most of the episodes of the 2008 HBO show Little Britain USA.

Jann has directed episodes of many other television comedy programs, including Community, Childrens Hospital, Crazy Ex-Girlfriend, Emily's Reasons Why Not, Flight of the Conchords, Friends with Benefits, Happy Endings, Notes from the Underbelly, Reaper, Suburgatory, Wedding Band and Daybreak.

Jann’s upcoming projects include the Western horror film Organ Trails, his second full-length feature.

Personal life
Jann is married to soap opera actress Lisa LoCicero. The two have two children: a son, Lukas, born in 2001, and a daughter, Verity Marion, born in 2015.

Filmography
 Drop Dead Gorgeous (1999)
 Bad News Mr. Swanson (2001)
 Emily's Reasons Why Not (2006)
 Most Likely to Succeed (2010)
 Ghosts/Aliens (2010)
 Brave New World (2011)
 El Jefe (2012)
 Grand Marquee (2015)
 I Shudder (2016)
 Organ Trails (2022)

References

External links

Videos by Michael Patrick Jann

1970 births
Living people
American sketch comedians
American male comedians
American male film actors
American film directors
American male television actors
American television writers
American male television writers
American television directors
Actors from Albany, New York
Male actors from New York (state)
Comedians from New York (state)
Screenwriters from New York (state)
21st-century American comedians
The Albany Academy alumni
21st-century American screenwriters
21st-century American male writers